Jan Denuwelaere (born 9 April 1988) is a Belgian former professional cyclo-cross cyclist.

Major results

2008–2009
 1st Kasteelcross Zonnebeke
 GvA Trophy Under-23
1st Krawatencross
 Under-23 Superprestige
2nd Hoogstraten
2009–2010
 Under-23 Superprestige
1st Zonhoven
3rd Diegem
 2nd National Under-23 Championships
 GvA Trophy Under-23
2nd Koppenbergcross
3rd Grand Prix Sven Nys
3rd Krawatencross
2010–2011
 1st Silvestercyclocross 
 2nd Grand-Prix de la Commune de Contern
 3rd Cyclo-cross Nommay
2011–2012
 1st Versluys
 Toi Toi Cup
2nd Stříbro
 3rd Grand-Prix de la Commune de Contern
2012–2013
 BPost Bank Trophy
1st Essen
 2nd Grand-Prix de la Commune de Contern

References

External links

1988 births
Living people
Belgian male cyclists
People from Poperinge
Cyclo-cross cyclists
Cyclists from West Flanders